The National Collegiate Athletic Association Tennis Championship is held every second semester of the academic year. It is divided into the Juniors (high school) and Seniors (college) tournaments.

Mapúa Institute of Technology has the most championships both in the Seniors and Juniors division.

Champions

Number of championships by school

Note
 LSGH won one championship under DLSU and four championships under CSB.

See also
 UAAP Tennis Championship

References

Champions list at the official NCAA Philippines website
Presidents and hosts list at the official NCAA Philippines website

Tennis
Tennis tournaments in the Philippines